Chanson à boire, (Drinking song), FP 31, is a choral work by Francis Poulenc, composed in 1922 on an anonymous text of the 17th century for a four-part men's chorus a cappella. It was published first by Rouart-Lerolle, but today by Salabert.

History 
Chanson à boire is Poulenc's first choral work, commissioned by a student choir, the Glee Club of Harvard University in the United States. Upon completion, Poulenc sent them the score. In an interview with Claude Rostand dated 1954, he said:

Twenty-eight years separate the composition of the work and its first performance in The Hague. Poulenc states: "I was ready to do a lot of retouching. What was not my amazement (...) of not having one note to change!."

Structure 
The work is written for an unaccompanied four-part men's chorus. The total performance time is approximately four minutes.

Selected recordings 
 Poulenc - Secular Choral Music, Norddeutscher Figuralchor,  (cond.), label MDG Gold, MDG9471595 ;
 Chansons française, Harry Christophers (cond.), label Technics, 1993

Notes

Bibliography 
1978:  

1995:

External links 
 Chanson à boire, FP 31 (Poulenc, Francis) on IMSLP

1922 compositions
Compositions by Francis Poulenc
Choral compositions